Tetraxenonogold(II), gold tetraxenide(II) or AuXe is a cationic complex with a square planar configuration of atoms. It is found in the compound AuXe(SbF) (tetraxenonogold undecafluorodiantimonate), which exists in triclinic and tetragonal crystal modifications. The AuXe ion is stabilised by interactions with the fluoride atoms of the counterion.
Tetraxenonogold(II) is unusual in that it is a coordination complex of xenon, which is weakly basic. It is also unusual in that it contains gold in the +2 oxidation state. It can be produced by reduction of AuF3 by xenon in the presence of fluoroantimonic acid.  The salt crystallises at low temperature. Four xenon atoms bond with the gold(II) ion to make this complex.

It was the first description of a compound between a noble gas and a noble metal. It was first described in 2000 by Konrad Seppelt and Stefan Seidel.

References

Cations
Gold compounds
Xenon compounds